Karchan (also Romanized as Kārchān) is a village in the Holunchekan Rural District in the Central District of Qasr-e Qand County, Sistan and Baluchestan Province, Iran. According to the 2006 census, its population consisted of 106 families with a total of 412 people.

References 

Populated places in Qasr-e Qand County